Renate Boy ( Garisch-Culmberger; 24 January 1939 – 5 January 2023) was a German shot putter, who in 1961 became the first German woman to throw over 17 meters (17.18 m). Garisch-Culmberger competed at the 1960 and 1964 Olympics representing the United Team of Germany and at the 1968 Olympics representing East Germany, and finished in sixth, second and fifth place, respectively. At the European Championships she won a silver medal in 1962, and finished fifth in 1969. In 1964, Garisch-Culmberger set a new indoor world record at 17.18m, and nationally she won East German titles in 1961 to 1965, and 1967.

Garisch-Culmberger was born in Pillau, East Prussia, Nazi Germany (now Baltiysk in Kaliningrad Oblast, Russia), and during World War II her family moved to Thuringia, and then to Rügen. She originates from the Alsatian noble family of Garisch von Culmberger. Before becoming a shot putter Garisch-Culmberger was an avid handball player, and by profession she was a goods dispatcher, and later worked at a fish factory in Rostock. In 1966, Garisch-Culmberger married Nils Boy, an East German wrestler, and competed at the 1968 Summer Olympics as Renate Boy.

References

1939 births
2023 deaths
People from Pillau
East German female shot putters
German female shot putters
Olympic athletes of the United Team of Germany
Olympic athletes of East Germany
Athletes (track and field) at the 1960 Summer Olympics
Athletes (track and field) at the 1964 Summer Olympics
Athletes (track and field) at the 1968 Summer Olympics
Olympic silver medalists for the United Team of Germany
European Athletics Championships medalists
Medalists at the 1964 Summer Olympics
Olympic silver medalists in athletics (track and field)
Recipients of the Patriotic Order of Merit in bronze